The Entertainment Quarter is an entertainment precinct in the Eastern Suburbs of Sydney, Australia. The Entertainment Quarter sits beside Disney Studios Australia Fox Studios Australia in the suburb of Moore Park, located 3 kilometres south-east of the Sydney central business district, and is part of local government area of the City of Sydney.
4.5 million people go through EQ each year.

Located next to The Sydney Cricket Ground and Allianz Stadium - which sees 1.5 million people visit them each year.
And Disney Studios Australia (previously Fox Studios) which is home to over 50 film and TV studios located just a gate away – shooting everything from major motion pictures, to local film and TV productions and creating the next generation of movies.

Inside the Entertainment Quarter is the Hordern - home to Live music and events for over 25 years. Also a live venue known as Liberty Hall (previously Max Watts).

Facilities
The Market Canopy located in the heart of The Entertainment Quarter's Showring hosts a bi-weekly Market on every Wednesday and Saturday, now in its 22 years at The Entertainment Quarter. Everything from fresh fruit and veg, artesian stores and delicious hot lunch options. 

The Entertainment Quarter is home to restaurants, cafes, stores and many fun things to do.

EQ is the home of The NRL Roosters, Sydney FC, Head office of the AFL, The New Sydney Kings basketball courts Hoops Capital and they are only weeks away from opening the new Sydney Swans HQ at the Royal Hall of Industries.

There are many live event spaces located at The Entertainment Quarter - including the 22,000 sqm Showring space, which has live events, large scale activations - like Magic Mike Live, Cirque, Van Gogh Alive and the Sydney Family Easter Show.

With over 17 restaurants and cafes include Marys EQ, Watsons EQ, Fratelli Fresh, El Camino, The Bavarian, Muffin Break, Jamaica Blue, Rio Barra, Black Star Bakery, Oporto's, AKIRA SUSHI, Cafe 2151 and the onsite winery Urban Winery Sydney 

Fun things to do at the EQ include Hyperkarting (located on Level 5 of the carpark) - which has seen over 400,000 come through the track, the huge Hoyts Cinema, arcades at B. Lucy and Sons, bowling at Strike Bowling, laugh along at The Comedy Store and the new World Gym.

Education 
The Entertainment Quarter is home to the Australian Film Television & Radio School (AFTRS). 

AFTRS relocated from its original location in North Ryde to a purpose built building in 2008, located adjacent to Fox Studios Australia and around the corner from the Hoyts Cinema.

Also located within the Entertainment Quarter is Brent Street Performance Arts Dance School - which sees over 1000 students each year.

History
The Entertainment Quarter and Fox Studios Australia were originally the site of Royal Agricultural Society of New South Wales Sydney Showground, which hosted the annual Sydney Royal Easter Show. The Sydney Showground moved to Homebush Bay in preparation for the 2000 Summer Olympics. Some of the venues built for the Olympic Games are now used for the annual show.

Fox Studios Australia and the entertainment precinct opened at Moore Park in 1998. A theme park at this location was closed, and some of the facilities have found new uses in the Entertainment Quarter.

In the early 1800s, after only a short period of European settlement, Sydney Town was already cluttered with buildings and over-crowded, and it was clear the residents would need somewhere outside the city to graze their livestock. So in 1811, Governor Lachlan Macquarie selected a large area of land with sandy soil and swampy patches, and called it Sydney Common. (On today’s map, that area would include Centennial Park, Moore Park Golf Course, ES Marks Athletics Field, Randwick Racecourse and the entire Moore Park precinct.)

The cattle was happy; the city-dwellers were happy. All good – until it was discovered that the Tank Stream, Sydney’s main water supply, had become polluted. With desalination technology still a long way off, the city needed to find a new natural water supply and it looked to the lagoons and marshes around Sydney Common (renamed Lachlan Swamp).

In 1837, local engineer, John Busby, designed an underground aqueduct to deliver water from Lachlan Swamp to Hyde Park. He dammed the lagoons and damned his slow convict workers, and set his name in stone by building Busby’s Bore. You can still find above-ground troughs and fountains along the course route today. From here on, the land around Lachland Swamp became less and less “common”.

In 1833, NSW Governor Richard Bourke sectioned off some of the land for use as a racecourse. (Until then, Hyde Park had been the main racing venue for the city.) The Australian Jockey Club was given the racecourse in 1863, merged with the Sydney Turf Club in 2011, and was given the official thumbs up from the Queen for the racecourse to become known as it is today – Royal Randwick.

By 1867, Sydney had itself a Municipal Council and they decided to carve off another chunk of Sydney Common and dedicate the land to the Mayor, Charles Moore. Named Moore Park, the land was to be developed for recreation and this was initiated with the planting of Moreton Bay Fig trees and Monterey Pines. Those trees are now large monuments and signature features of the Moore Park area.

While the flora was flourishing there was little in the way of fauna until 1879 when a Zoological Garden was established, boasting among its collection an elephant donated by the King of Siam. However the zoo was plagued by bad luck and an actual plague – Bubonic to be specific. A kangaroo found to be afflicted with the contagion caused the zoo to be shut down and buildings within it burnt. Eventually a new zoo with a view was established on the edge of Sydney Harbour at Taronga Park.

To commemorate the one hundredth anniversary of European settlement, in 1888 a large tract of land was sectioned off as a nature reserve and called Centennial Park. It was within a specially built pavilion in this park that, on January 1, 1901, Lord Hopetoun was sworn in as the first Governor General of the freshly federated Australia.

Arguably, the organisation that had the most influence on the look and character of Moore Park is the Royal Agricultural Society of NSW (RAS). It established the Showground and held its first exhibition in 1882. The exhibition was a showcase of produce, art, craft, machinery and display of talent and skills (including woodchopping, equestrian, and whip cracking) that became known as the Royal Easter Show, an annual event still firmly fixed on the Sydney cultural calendar. “The Show” grew in size and duration until it outgrew the venue and relocated to Sydney Olympic Park in 1997.
During times of the year when it wasn’t Easter, the Main Arena, known as The Showground, hosted other major events. It doubled as the Sydney Showground Speedway from 1926 − 1996, drawing large crowds to watch motorcycle, speedcar, and stockcar racing, demolition derby, and daredevil displays.

The first official NSW Rugby League Premiership game was played at the Showground – NSW vs New Zealand in 1907 (NZ won). Rugby League grand finals were played there until 1987. The first Ashes Test Cricket match in Australia was played there in 1883 and the infamous World Series Cricket was forced to stage its first match there in 1977. It later became the favoured outdoor venue for stadium style concerts and hosted shows by, among others, Led Zeppelin, ABBA, David Bowie, The Police and KISS.

The Sydney Cricket Ground (SCG) began life as a flat oval but by 1882 it had two grandstands, The Brewongle Stand and Member’s Stand. By around 1920 it resembled the grounds we recognise today. The immortal Sir Don Bradman drew large crowds during the 1920s and ‘30s. In 1978 the rebellious World Series Cricket created by Kerry Packer, held its first match there and led to the construction of six highly luminous light towers for night cricket. The SCG is Sydney’s preeminent cricket ground.

When the RAS moved to Homebush, the Showground was redeveloped to cater for a diverse range of uses including film, television and entertainment industries.

The Hordern Pavilion was built as an exhibition space by RAS in 1924. In 1972 it was modified to accommodate various uses and became the indoor venue for live music concerts until 1983 when the Sydney Entertainment Centre opened. It then became home to rave parties including the Mardi Gras Party and Sleaze Ball. It still functioned as an exhibition hall during the Easter Shows until 1997 when it was privately purchased, renovated and once again has become a preferred venue for live music and other events.

The Royal Hall of Industries was built in 1913 and described as a treasure trove of futuristic exhibits, including motor cycles, insecticides, photographic equipment, jewellery, novelties and musical instruments. It’s colourful resume includes having been used as a morgue, dance hall, roller and ice skating rink, boxing venue and beloved Showbag Pavilion for the Easter Show. It too was privately purchased after the RAS moved and is now hired out for large functions, festivals and events.

Today, the main focus of activities around the Moore Park precinct revolves around sports, entertainment, arts, culture and lifestyle. As a key component of the precinct, the Entertainment Quarter accommodates many of those activities and provides open spaces for hire for public and private events.

References

External links
 The Entertainment Quarter

Tourist attractions in Sydney
Entertainment districts in Australia
Moore Park, New South Wales